Sukumarudu is a 2013 Indian Telugu-language romantic drama film directed by G. Ashok and produced by K. Venugopal's Sri Soudhamini Creations. The film stars Aadi in the titular role alongside Nisha Aggarwal and Bhavna Ruparel. Krishna and Sharada appear in guest roles. Music is composed by Anup Rubens. The film was theatrically released on 10 May 2013.

Plot
The story is about Sukumar (Aadi), a rich, young guy who lives abroad. His family lives back home in a beautiful village. Sukumar comes back because of property. There is Sankari (Nisha Aggarwal), a beautiful girl waiting to fall in love. Sukumar faces difficulty from a few family members, and what follows is how he manages to win hearts (and property).

Cast

Aadi as Sukumar
Nisha Aggarwal as Sankari
Bhavna Ruparel as Devaki
Krishna
Sharada
Srinivas Avasarala as ANR
Rao Ramesh as SVR
Brahmanandam
Gollapudi Maruti Rao
Ajay
Raghu Karumanchi

Production

Casting
Initially Siddharth was approached to play the main protagonist the film. But due to lack of dates, he walked out of the movie. Aadi, the son of veteran Telugu actor Sai Kumar, who had already two decent hits Prema Kavali and Lovely was roped in. Nisha Aggarwal, the younger sister of prominent Telugu actress Kajal Aggarwal, who had given good performances in her earlier films Yemaindi Ee Vela and Solo, was roped in as the female lead and Bhavna Ruparel was also roped in as the female lead.

Filming

Adi's Sukumarudu Movie Audio Launch was held in Hyderabad on 31 March 2013 . The launching of the shooting of the film began at Ramanaidu studios in Hyderabad on 23 May 2012. Sreenu Vaitla gave the first clap. K S Rama Rao and Bellamkonda Suresh switched the camera on. The shooting was done in a full-fledged mode since then and in July it completed 40% of its shoot and some key scenes were shot in Nanakramguda at Vizianagaram. Later the Shooting was shifted to Ramoji film city where Key scenes featuring Aadi and Nisha were shot. In August, it was reported that The film is being made with a big star cast of 54 artists, the film completed 60% of shot in 2 schedules. The 3rd schedule will begin from 15 August and most of the shot will be completed by 3rd schedule. In October it was Reported that the film has completed its talkie part, and will move to Europe for its songs. The producers stated that the Schedule would start from 24 October and would be completed or on nearly 9 November and the film would be Released in December after the completion of its patchwork in November. In November, it was declared that the film's shoot is coming to an end and the last schedule has just started, and the movie's audio launch will take place in December. On 22 December 2012 it was declared that the climax fight sequence is being canned on Aadi and the film's main villain near Mylavaram and Except for a song and another fight sequence, the rest of the film's shooting has been wrapped up. In January 2013, it was reported that the movie is currently in the final stages of shooting and a song will be shot from 10 February onwards, and the movie is scheduled for a release in March 2013. But later, it was informed that the movie would release in April 2013. After the film's principal shooting has been wrapped up, it was reported that a song featuring the three lead actors was shot in Hyderabad and Post-production works are in full swing.

Release
The movie was awarded a U/A Certificate by The Central Board of Film Certification on 4 May 2013. The movie is slated for a worldwide release on 10 May 2013.

Soundtrack

The music was composed by Anoop Rubens. The audio was launched on 31 March 2013 at Novatel Hotel in Hyderabad. Aditya Music won the audio rights of this film. The audio got positive response.

Reception
Girija Narayan of Filmibeat gave it 2 out of 5, calling it "3 Hours of pain" due to the length of the film Sushil Rao of The Times of India gave the film 3 out of 5. Both Business Standard and News18 India gave the film 1 out of 2 and 2.5 out of 5 quoting "The film turns cheerful after the arrival of the protagonist in the village, but the overall presentation gets melodramatic and, therefore, it fails to engage the audience throughout." NDTV praised Aadi's dance moves but criticized it emotional scenes.

References

External links

2013 films
2010s Telugu-language films
2013 romantic comedy-drama films
Indian romantic comedy-drama films
2013 comedy films
2013 drama films